Frances Chung is a Canadian ballet dancer. She is currently a principal dancer at the San Francisco Ballet.

Early life
Chung was born in Vancouver and is of Chinese descent. Her father worked for an electronic company, her mother was a cook, and her sister works in finance. She started ballet and playing the piano when she was five, at a community centre near her home. She attended Magee Secondary School and trained at Goh Ballet Academy. Though most of Chung's teachers are Chinese, she was trained in multiple dance styles, such as French, Russian and English. She also did contemporary, jazz, and Asian dance. However, she did not have any American training. When she was 16, she attended a summer intensives at Boston Ballet, she was then asked to join the studio company, but her mother insisted she graduate high school.

Career
In 2001, after she finished high school, Chung joined the San Francisco Ballet, at the age of 17. Chung stated that part of the reason she joined the company was because she wanted to stay on the west coast. She was named soloist in 2005 and principal dancer in 2009. Chung has danced roles such as Odette/Odile in Swan Lake, Princess Aurora in The Sleeping Beauty and the title role in Cinderella. She has participated in San Francisco Ballet's co-production with other companies, such as a stepsister in Cinderella with Dutch National Ballet and Elizabeth Lavenza in Frankenstein with The Royal Ballet. She has also originated roles such as in Stanton Welch's Bespoke and Dwight Rhoden's LET'S BEGIN AT THE END.

Outside of San Francisco Ballet, Chung has danced in galas in Canada, United States, Mexico, Germany, Australia, France and Italy. In 2018, she danced in Welch's Swan Lake, with Houston Ballet.

Selected repertoire
Chung's repertoire with the San Francisco Ballet includes:

Awards
Isadora Duncan Award for Outstanding Achievement in Performance (Individual) for San Francisco Ballet's 2013 Repertory Season.
Finalist at the Helsinki International Competition, 2001.
Awarded silver medal (no gold medal awarded) at the Adeline Genée Awards, London, 2000.
Finalist and prizewinner at the Prix de Lausanne, 2000.
3rd place with partner Nozomi Haga at the Japan National Pas de Deux Competition, 1999.

Personal life
Chung is married. The couple welcomed a son in 2019.

References

External links
Frances Chung - San Francisco Ballet profile
Frances Chung: Artist Spotlight
Frances Chung on The Nutcracker
Frances Chung in LET'S BEGIN AT THE END

1980s births
Living people
Canadian ballerinas
San Francisco Ballet principal dancers
People from Vancouver
Canadian female dancers
21st-century ballet dancers
Canadian expatriates in the United States
Canadian people of Chinese descent